A Library of Congress Living Legend was someone recognized by the Library of Congress for creative contributions to American life. Those honored include artists, writers, activists, film makers, physicians, entertainers, sports figures, and public servants. Librarian of Congress Carla Hayden retired the program in 2018.

List of honorees

 Hank Aaron (d. 2021)
 Madeleine Albright (d. 2022)
 Muhammad Ali (d. 2016)
 Mario Andretti
 Ernie Banks (d. 2015)
 Harry Belafonte
 Tony Bennett
 James H. Billington (d. 2018)
 Big Bird (original performer Caroll Spinney d. 2019)
 Larry Bird 
 Herblock (d. 2001)
 Judy Blume
 Julian Bond (d. 2015)
 T. Berry Brazelton (d. 2018)
 Gwendolyn Brooks (d. 2000)
 Dave Brubeck (d. 2012)
 Kobe Bryant (d. 2020)
 William F. Buckley, Jr. (d. 2008)
 Carol Burnett
 Laura Bush
 Ben Carson
 Benny Carter (d. 2003)
 Johnny Cash (d. 2003)
 Vinton Cerf
 Ray Charles (d. 2004)
 Linda Chavez
 Julia Child (d. 2004)
 Beverly Cleary (d. 2021)
 David Copperfield
 Bill Cosby 
 Walter Cronkite (d. 2009)
 Merce Cunningham (d. 2009)
 Michael DeBakey (d. 2008)
 Sylvia Earle
 Marian Wright Edelman
 Ahmet Ertegun (d. 2006)
 Suzanne Farrell
 John Kenneth Galbraith (d. 2006)
 Andrew Goodpaster (d. 2005)
 Stephen Jay Gould (d. 2002)
 Katharine Graham (d. 2001)
 Archie Green (d. 2009)
 Thomas Hampson
 Herbie Hancock
 Mickey Hart
 Al Hirschfeld (d. 2003)
 Bob Hope (d. 2003)
 Marta Casals Istomin
 Glenn R. Jones (d. 2015)
 Quincy Jones
 Jenette Kahn
 Max Kampelman (d. 2013)
 George Kennan (d. 2005)
 Jackie Joyner Kersee
 B.B. King (d. 2015)
 Billie Jean King
 Jeane Kirkpatrick (d. 2006)
 John Kluge (d. 2010)
 Ursula K. Le Guin (d. 2018)
 Annie Leibovitz
 Miguel León-Portilla (d. 2019)
 Carl Lewis
 John Lewis (d. 2020)
 Mario Vargas Llosa
 Alan Lomax (d. 2002)
 Yo-Yo Ma
 Robert McCloskey (d. 2003)
 David McCullough (d. 2022)
 Mark McGwire
 Rita Moreno
 Toni Morrison (d. 2019)
 Odetta (d. 2008)
 Gordon Parks (d. 2006)
 Dolly Parton
 Katherine Paterson
 I. M. Pei (d. 2019)
 Jaroslav Pelikan (d. 2006)
 Itzhak Perlman
 Colin Powell (d. 2021)
 Leontyne Price
 Tito Puente (d. 2000)
 Sally K. Ride (d. 2012)
 Cal Ripken
 Cokie Roberts (d. 2019)
 Frank Robinson (d. 2019)
 Fred Rogers (d. 2003)
 Philip Roth (d. 2018)
 Bob Schieffer
 Gunther Schuller (d. 2015)
 Martin Scorsese
 Pete Seeger (d. 2014)
 Maurice Sendak (d. 2012)
 Bobby Short (d. 2005)
 Stephen Sondheim (d. 2021)
 Steven Spielberg
 Ralph Stanley (d. 2016)
 Gloria Steinem
 Isaac Stern (d. 2001)
 Barbra Streisand
 William Styron (d. 2006)
 Harold Varmus
 Gwen Verdon (d. 2000)
 Lew Wasserman (d. 2002)
 Fred L. Whipple (d. 2004)
 Joseph Wilson (d. 2015)
 Tiger Woods
 Herman Wouk (d. 2019)

See also

 List of awards for contributions to culture
 List of medicine awards

References

External links
Library of Congress to Honor "Living Legends" (press release, with initial honorees). April 14, 2000. Public Affairs Office. Library of Congress official website
 Living Legends (full list). Library of Congress official website, archived from the Internet Wayback Machine. Original site no longer extant.

Living Legend
Arts awards in the United States
Medicine awards
Governance and civic leadership awards
American sports trophies and awards
2000 establishments in the United States
2018 disestablishments in the United States